Writer's Market (WM) is an annual resource book for writers who wish to sell their work. The publication is released by Writer's Digest Books and usually hits bookstores around the summer time of each year. Writer's Market was first published in 1921, and is often called "The Bible for writers" or "the freelancer's Bible."

Writer’s Digest's former parent company, F+W Media, was auctioned off as part of bankruptcy proceedings in 2019. Penguin Random House LLC acquired the Writer's Digest Books brand, including  Market Books and WritersMarket.com.

Listings 
For nearly 100 years, the book has listed thousands of markets for writers who wish to sell their work. Said markets include magazines, newspapers, theaters (for stage plays), production companies, contests of all types, greeting card companies, literary agents, and more. Each listing has detailed instructions on how to submit work, relevant contact information, and well as what work each listing seeks.

Articles 
The upfront section of WM has more than a dozen articles on writing topics, such as starting a freelancing business, syndication, freelancing for magazines, and a chart filled with typical payment rates concerning various writing assignments.

"Market Books" 
Writer's Market is one of nine "market books" published each year by Writer's Digest Books. Others include: Guide to Literary Agents, Photographer's Market, Children's Writer's & Illustrator's Market, Novel & Short Story Writer's Market, Artist and Graphic Designer's Market, Poet's Market, Screenwriter's & Playwright's Market and Songwriter's Market. Each book is designed to give writers instructions on how to submit freelance work to markets.

References

External links 
 
Writer's Digest magazine official site

Directories
 
American literary agencies